The 2022 Liberal Party of Australia (Victorian Division) leadership election was an election to appoint the leader of the Victorian branch of the Liberal Party and Leader of the Opposition after the 2022 Victorian state election. Matthew Guy, who had held these roles since September 2021 and previously in 2018 resigned after the Coalition's defeat to the Australian Labor Party at the November election.

Moderate John Pesutto defeated conservative Brad Battin 17 votes to 16, while David Southwick retained the position of Deputy Leader. In the Legislative Council, Georgie Crozier succeeded David Davis as leader, with Matthew Bach elected deputy leader unopposed.

Background
Following the Coalition's defeat at the 2014 Victorian state election under then Premier Denis Napthine, Matthew Guy, who was Ministers for Planning and Multicultural Affairs and Citizenship, was elected as the leader of the Liberal Party and subsequently Opposition Leader with Peter Walsh as his deputy from the National Party. Guy led the coalition to a landslide defeat at the 2018 Victorian state election and resigned as leader following the results. Former Treasurer Michael O'Brien succeeded him as the leader.

By 2021, O'Brien's position was increasingly becoming the subject of speculation that the party was to replace him. On 16 March 2021, members of the shadow frontbench Ryan Smith, Brad Battin and Nick Wakeling resigned. Battin subsequently put forward a leadership spill motion on 17 March 2021, which saw O'Brien surviving the leadership challenge against him.

In September 2021, there was further speculation about O'Brien's leadership. On 6 September 2021, Guy and another frontbench member, Tim Smith resigned from O'Brien's shadow ministry. Later, another spill motion was called, which was successful with the Liberal caucus voting 20-11 for the motion and the leadership becoming vacated. The same day, Guy was elected leader for a second time unopposed. 

Following the 2022 Victorian state election where the Coalition was again defeated, Guy announced his resignation as leader resulting in a leadership election for the next term.

Candidates

Leadership
Following Guy's resignation as party leader, three candidates initially declared their intent to contest the election, all from the party's conservative faction—Brad Battin, who first challenged the party leadership in 2021; Ryan Smith; and Richard Riordan. Both Ryan and Battin had returned to the Shadow Ministry following Guy's return to the party leadership in 2021. On 30 November, Smith withdrew his candidacy, endorsing Battin; the following day, Riordan followed.

A fourth candidate, moderate John Pesutto, had publicly expressed his interest, although his candidacy was conditional on him regaining the seat of Hawthorn, which was lost to Labor's John Kennedy in 2018. On 30 November 2022, both Kennedy and teal independent challenger Melissa Lowe conceded defeat in the seat of Hawthorn; Pesutto officially announcing his candidacy on 1 December.

Nominated

Withdrew

Declined
Michael O'Brien, former Opposition Leader (2018–2021) and MP for Malvern
Georgie Crozier, Deputy Leader of the Liberal Party in the Legislative Council and MLC for Southern Metropolitan Region

Deputy leadership

Nominated

Leadership election in the Legislative Council

There was speculation that the party's leadership in the Victorian Legislative Council may be contested. Prior to the election, David Davis was the leader in the council for the party. Some within the party advocated for others to challenge Davis. Some of the names that were listed included Bev McArthur, Matthew Bach and Georgie Crozier.

Crozier and McArthur ultimately stood for the leadership, with Crozier elected leader 21 votes to 12.

References

2022 elections in Australia
Liberal Party of Australia leadership spills
Liberal Party of Australia (Victorian Division) leadership election